Disability Living Allowance (DLA) is a social security benefit in the United Kingdom paid to eligible claimants who have personal care and/or mobility needs as a result of a mental or physical disability. It is tax-free, non-means-tested and non-contributory. The benefit was established by the Social Security Contributions and Benefits Act 1992, integrating the former benefits Mobility Allowance and Attendance Allowance and introducing two additional lower rates of benefit. Prior to 2013 it could be claimed by UK residents aged under sixty five years. However, the benefit was phased-out for the majority of claimants between 2013 and 2015 and replaced by a new Personal Independence Payment. DLA can still be claimed by children under sixteen and can still be received by existing claimants who were aged sixty five or over on 8 April 2013.

Eligibility

DLA is restricted to people who fall into all of the following categories:

 They must ordinarily be resident and present in the UK
 They must meet the rules concerning age: new DLA claims can only be made if the claimant is under 16; however existing claimants can continue to claim DLA if they were born on or before 8 April 1948.
 They must not be living in certain types of residential accommodation
 They must have had a disability for at least three months, and expect it to continue for at least six more months
 They must have care and/or mobility needs.
Usually, to qualify for Disability Living Allowance (DLA) for children the child must:
 Be under sixteen
 Need extra looking after or have walking difficulties
 Be in Great Britain, another European Economic Area (EEA) country or Switzerland when you claim - there are some exceptions, e.g. family members of the Armed Forces
 Be habitually resident in the UK, Ireland, Isle of Man or the Channel Islands
 Not be subject to immigration control
 Have lived in Great Britain for two of the last three years, if over 3 years old
Children under the age of three.
 A child under six months must have lived in Great Britain for at least thirteen weeks.
 A child aged between six months and three years must have lived in Great Britain for at least twenty six of the last 156 weeks.

Individuals can qualify for DLA whether or not they are working. Earnings do not affect the amount of DLA received.  People who are terminally ill typically qualify for the highest rate of Care component of DLA under what is termed "special rules".

Care component
DLA care component is paid at one of three rates: lowest, middle and highest.  From April 2021 the rates are:

Lowest rate eligibility
Individuals are entitled to the lowest rate care component if they are so severely disabled that they:
 require another person to give them attention in connection with their bodily functions for a significant portion of the day during a single period or a number of periods; or
 cannot prepare a cooked main meal for themselves provided they have all the ingredients and are aged 16 or over.

Middle rate eligibility
Individuals are entitled to the middle rate care component if they are so severely disabled that they: 
 require another person to give them frequent attention throughout the day in connection with their bodily functions; or
 require prolonged or repeated attention during the night in connection with their bodily functions; or
 require continual supervision throughout the day in order to avoid substantial danger to themselves or others; or
 require another person to be awake for a prolonged period or at frequent intervals at night, for the purpose of watching over them in order to avoid substantial danger to themselves or others.

Highest rate eligibility
Individuals are entitled to the highest rate care component if they meet one of the day conditions and one of the night conditions for the middle rate care component.

Mobility component
DLA mobility component is paid at one of two rates: lower and higher.  From April 2021 the rates are:

Lower rate eligibility
Individuals are entitled to the lower rate mobility component if they are so severely mentally or physically disabled that they cannot walk outdoors on an unfamiliar route without guidance or supervision from another person most of the time.

Higher rate eligibility
Individuals are entitled to the higher rate mobility component if they:- 
 are physically disabled and as a result are unable, or virtually unable, to walk; or
 are physically disabled and the exertion required to walk would endanger their life or health; or
 have had both legs amputated at or above the ankle, or were born without legs or feet; or are blind and deaf and need someone with them outdoors.
 are severely mentally impaired and/or have severe behavioural problems and receive the highest rate care component.

Mobility allowances (usually using the Motability scheme) are structured to provide persons with disabilities with mechanical aids to their mobility, which may include wheelchairs, scooters, or automobiles.

See also
Severe Disablement Allowance
Invalidity Benefit
Incapacity Benefit
Attendance Allowance
Employment and Support Allowance
Personal Independence Payment

References

External links
Guardian Special Report - State Benefits

Social security in the United Kingdom
Disability in the United Kingdom